Bybera is a rural locality in the Goondiwindi Region, Queensland, Australia.

Geography 
The Twenty Five Mile Rocky Waterhole is a waterhole.

White Dam is a reservoir.

History 
Named and bounded by the Minister for Natural Resources 17 December 1999. Locality re-gazetted by an Amendment Notice published on the 20 January 2012 due to the council amalgamations under the Local Government Reform Implementation Act 2007.

Notable residents 
 Eugen Hirschfeld, owned a property in the area and died and was buried there

References 

Goondiwindi Region
Localities in Queensland